The 1946 San Francisco 49ers season was the inaugural season of the San Francisco 49ers and the first season of the All-America Football Conference. Led by head coach Buck Shaw, the team compiled a 9–5 record and finished second in the AAFC West Division. The 49ers also had the second best scoring offense (307 points scored) in the AAFC.

The team's statistical leaders included quarterback Frankie Albert with 1,404 passing yards, fullback Norm Standlee with 651 rushing yards, and end Alyn Beals with 586 receiving yards and 61 points scored.

Personnel

Staff

Roster

The following table lists the final roster for the 49ers in the 1946 season.

Preseason

Regular season

Schedule

Game summaries
All game reports use the Pro Football Researchers' gamebook archive as a source.

Week 1

Week 2

Week 3

Week 4

Week 5

Week 6

Standings

References

San Francisco 49ers seasons
San Francisco 49ers
San Francisco 49ers